Raul-Victor Surdu-Soreanu (July 11, 1947 – April 7, 2011) was a Romanian politician who served as the country's first post-Communist Minister of Agriculture following the 1989 Revolution. He was a member of the Social Democratic Party (PSD).

Surdu was born in Iaşi. He worked as a manager for Romania's collective farm system during the Communist era, and then joined the National Salvation Front (FSN), which took power after the overthrow of Nicolae Ceaușescu. 

Surdu served as Minister of Agriculture from 1989 to 1990. He was a member of the Chamber of Deputies for the Democratic Agrarian Party of Romania (PDAR) from 1990 to 1992, and for the Social Democratic Party (PSD) from 2008 until his death. For a brief period in the mid-1990s, he was deputy manager of Lukoil of Romania.

Surdu died from pancreatic cancer in Bucharest in 2011, at the age of 63. He was survived by his wife, singer Angela Similea, and three children.

References 

1947 births
2011 deaths
Politicians from Iași
Romanian Ministers of Agriculture
People of the Romanian Revolution
Social Democratic Party (Romania) politicians
Members of the Chamber of Deputies (Romania)
Deaths from cancer in Romania
Deaths from pancreatic cancer